Syria competed at the 1988 Summer Olympics in Seoul, South Korea.

Competitors
The following is the list of number of competitors in the Games.

Athletics

Men
Field events

Boxing

Men

Weightlifting

Men

Wrestling

Men's freestyle

Men's Greco-Roman

References

Official Olympic Reports

Nations at the 1988 Summer Olympics
1988
Olympics, Summer